Sir Robert Coke, 2nd Baronet (1645–1688), of Longford, Derbyshire, was an English politician.

Family
Coke was the son of Sir Edward Coke, 1st Baronet. He was one of the Coke family.

Career
He was a Member (MP) of the Parliament of England for Derbyshire in 1685.

References

1645 births
1688 deaths
English MPs 1685–1687
People from Longford, Derbyshire
Baronets in the Baronetage of England
Members of the Parliament of England for Derbyshire
High Sheriffs of Derbyshire